The 2022 Elimination Chamber (known as No Escape in Germany) was the 12th Elimination Chamber professional wrestling pay-per-view (PPV) and livestreaming  event produced by WWE. It was held for wrestlers from the promotion's Raw and SmackDown brand divisions. The event took place on Saturday, February 19, 2022, at the Jeddah Super Dome in Jeddah, Saudi Arabia.

It was the seventh event that WWE held in Saudi Arabia under a 10-year partnership in support of Saudi Vision 2030. It was also the first Elimination Chamber event to take place outside of the United States, the first to be held on a Saturday, and the first to air on the livestreaming service Peacock. It was also WWE's first previously-established event to take place in the country.

Seven matches were contested at the event, including one on the Kickoff pre-show. The event featured two Elimination Chamber matches, one each for the men and women; both were for the Raw brand. In the main event, Brock Lesnar won the men's eponymous match to win the WWE Championship, while Bianca Belair won the women's match to earn a Raw Women's Championship match at WrestleMania 38. In other prominent matches, Becky Lynch defeated Lita to retain the Raw Women's Championship, and in the opening bout, Roman Reigns defeated Goldberg to retain SmackDown's Universal Championship.

Production

Background 

Elimination Chamber is a gimmick event first produced by the American promotion WWE in 2010. It has been held every year since, except in 2016, generally in February. The concept of the event is that one or two main event matches are contested inside the Elimination Chamber, either with championships or future opportunities at championships at stake. The 2022 event was the 12th Elimination Chamber and featured wrestlers from the Raw and SmackDown brand divisions. In addition to airing on pay-per-view worldwide and the WWE Network in international markets, it was the first Elimination Chamber to air on Peacock after the American version of the WWE Network merged under Peacock in March 2021.

In early 2018, WWE began a 10-year strategic multiplatform partnership with the General Sports Authority in support of Saudi Vision 2030, Saudi Arabia's social and economic reform program. On January 17, 2022, the seventh event under this partnership was announced as Elimination Chamber, scheduled for Saturday, February 19, 2022, at the Jeddah Super Dome in Jeddah. It was in turn the first Elimination Chamber event to take place in Saudi Arabia, the first to take place outside of the United States, and the first to be held on a Saturday. It was also WWE's first previously-established event to take place in the country.

In 2011 and since 2013, the show has been promoted as "No Escape" in Germany as it was feared that the name "Elimination Chamber" may remind people of the gas chambers used during the Holocaust.

Storylines 
The event compromised seven matches, including one on the Kickoff pre-show, that resulted from scripted storylines, where wrestlers portrayed heroes, villains, or less distinguishable characters in scripted events that built tension and culminated in a wrestling match or series of matches. Results were predetermined by WWE's writers on the Raw and SmackDown brands, while storylines were produced on WWE's weekly television shows, Monday Night Raw and Friday Night SmackDown.

At the Royal Rumble, Bobby Lashley defeated Brock Lesnar to win the WWE Championship due to Paul Heyman betraying Lesnar. On the following episode of Raw, it was announced that Lashley would defend the WWE Championship in an Elimination Chamber match at Elimination Chamber. Lesnar then came out and demanded a rematch against Lashley that night as Lashley did not fairly win the title; however, on MVP's advice, Lashley declined. WWE official Adam Pearce then announced that Lesnar would be competing in the Elimination Chamber match. Later, Seth "Freakin" Rollins also announced that he would be one of the participants due to technically winning his match at the Royal Rumble. The final three spots were determined in qualification matches that night: Austin Theory, Riddle, and AJ Styles qualified by defeating Kevin Owens, Raw Tag Team Champion Otis, and Rey Mysterio, respectively.

Roman Reigns was originally scheduled to face Goldberg for the Universal Championship at WrestleMania 36 in April 2020; however, due to the onset of the COVID-19 pandemic shortly before the event, Reigns pulled out of the match due to his immunocompromised state from past battles with leukemia. Goldberg faced another challenger at that event who defeated him for the title. Nearly two years later on the February 4, 2022, episode of SmackDown, with Reigns now as champion after winning the title at Payback in August 2020, Goldberg appeared and challenged Reigns to a match for the Universal Championship at Elimination Chamber, which was made official.

At Day 1, Drew McIntyre defeated Madcap Moss, who was accompanied by Happy Corbin. Later that night, while McIntyre was interviewed backstage, Corbin and Moss attacked McIntyre, injuring his neck, which was reported to require surgery. At the Royal Rumble, McIntyre made a surprise return from his injury during the Royal Rumble match and eliminated Corbin and Moss, after which, McIntyre attacked Corbin and Moss further with the steel steps following their elimination. On the following SmackDown, McIntyre stated he would continue to target the two due to them almost ending his career. A rematch between McIntyre and Moss was scheduled for Elimination Chamber. The rematch was then stipulated as a Falls Count Anywhere match.

On the February 11 episode of SmackDown, after Charlotte Flair retained the SmackDown Women's Championship against Naomi, Flair and Sonya Deville, who has had a long history with Naomi which dated back to September 2021, attacked Naomi until Ronda Rousey (who chose to face Flair for the SmackDown Women's Championship at WrestleMania 38 the previous week) made the save. It was subsequently confirmed that Rousey would team with Naomi to take on Deville and Flair at Elimination Chamber. On the February 18 episode, during the contract signing for the match, it was revealed that Rousey would have to wrestle with one arm tied behind her back.

On the February 7 episode of Raw, a women's Elimination Chamber match was scheduled for Elimination Chamber with the winner earning a Raw Women's Championship match at WrestleMania 38. Bianca Belair, Liv Morgan, Rhea Ripley, Doudrop, and Nikki A.S.H. were announced for the match with one spot to be filled. The following week, Belair defeated all the other women in a gauntlet match to earn the right to enter the match last. Also on that episode, after weeks of therapy sessions after her doll Lily had been destroyed at Extreme Rules in September 2021, Alexa Bliss completed her final session and named herself as the sixth competitor for the match.

On the January 14 episode of SmackDown, The Viking Raiders (Erik and Ivar) won a fatal four-way tag team match to become the number one contenders for The Usos' (Jey Uso and Jimmy Uso) SmackDown Tag Team Championship. The match was later scheduled for Elimination Chamber.

On the January 31 episode of Raw, The Miz defeated Dominik Mysterio. The following week, Dominik and his father Rey Mysterio were guests on "Miz TV". Rey claimed that Miz cheated to defeat Dominik while Miz took issue that Rey had an opportunity to qualify for the WWE Championship Elimination Chamber match while he did not and also that Rey was the cover star of the WWE 2K22 video game. Miz also questioned if Rey was truly Dominik's dad, referencing the child custody battle that Rey had with Eddie Guerrero back at SummerSlam in 2005. Dominik then defeated Miz in a rematch. On the February 14 episode, during The Mysterios' match, The Miz provided a distraction, causing them to lose. Afterwards, The Miz and Maryse tossed Dominik out of the ring, and The Miz performed a Skull-Crushing Finale on Rey. Later that night, a match between The Miz and Rey was scheduled for Elimination Chamber. On the day of the event, the match was scheduled for the Kickoff pre-show.

On the January 31 episode of Raw, Raw Women's Champion Becky Lynch was confronted by Lita, who challenged the champion for the title at Elimination Chamber, which was made official.

Event

Pre-show
During the Elimination Chamber Kickoff pre-show, Rey Mysterio (accompanied by Dominik Mysterio) faced The Miz. During the match, Miz retrieved a chair, however, Rey performed a Crossbody on Miz. As Miz tried to use the chair again, Dominik thwarted Miz, however, Miz feigned getting attacked by Dominik. This resulted in the referee ejecting Dominik from ringside. In the end, Rey rolled up Miz to win the match. Following the match, Rey and Dominik performed double 619's on Miz.

Preliminary matches
The actual pay-per-view opened with Roman Reigns (accompanied by Paul Heyman) defending the Universal Championship against Goldberg. Reigns cut a quick promo stating that the Kingdom of Saudi Arabia must acknowledge Reigns before Goldberg made his entrance. At the start of the match, Reigns threw Goldberg out of the ring. The two fought at ringside where Goldberg threw Reigns into the barricade. Back in the ring, Goldberg performed a Spear on Reigns. As Goldberg attempted a Jackhammer, Reigns countered into a Uranage for a nearfall. Reigns performed a Superman Punch on Goldberg. As Reigns attempted a Spear, Goldberg countered into a Spear of his own. Goldberg attempted another Jackhammer, however, Reigns countered into the guillotine submission hold on Goldberg, who passed out, thus Reigns retained the title.

Next, the women's Elimination Chamber match was contested where the winner would earn a Raw Women's Championship match at WrestleMania 38. Liv Morgan and Nikki A.S.H. started the match. The third entrant was Doudrop followed by Rhea Ripley. Ripley went after Nikki where both climbed the Chamber wall and fell onto Morgan. Ripley performed a Riptide on Nikki to eliminate her. The fifth entrant was Alexa Bliss. Morgan performed a Sitout Powerbomb on Doudrop to eliminate her. The last entrant was Bianca Belair, who earned the opportunity to enter last by winning a gauntlet match on the preceding episode of Raw. Belair and Ripley performed double vertical Suplexes on Morgan and Bliss, respectively. Bliss performed Twisted Bliss on Morgan to eliminate her. Belair performed a Kiss Of Death on Ripley to eliminate her. In the end, Belair performed a Kiss of Death on Bliss to win the match and earn a Raw Women's Championship match at WrestleMania 38.

After that, Ronda Rousey and Naomi faced SmackDown Women's Champion Charlotte Flair and WWE official Sonya Deville where Rousey had to wrestle with one arm tied behind her back. In the end, Rousey forced Deville to submit to the armbar to win the match.

In the fourth match, Drew McIntyre faced Madcap Moss (accompanied by Happy Corbin) in a Falls Count Anywhere match. Throughout the match, Corbin and Moss double-teamed McIntyre, but could not get the win. At one point, McIntyre performed an inverted Alabama Slam on Moss, who landed on his head. Later, McIntyre performed a Superplex on Moss for a nearfall. In the end, McIntyre swung his sword, but Corbin ducked it and retreated. McIntyre then performed a Claymore Kick on Moss and pinned him with one foot while glaring at Corbin to win the match.

Backstage, The Miz was interviewed about his loss during the pre-show where he accused Rey Mysterio of cheating due to help from his son Dominik. Miz said he would find a tag team partner and that it would be a "global superstar".

In the penultimate match, Becky Lynch defended the Raw Women's Championship against Lita. During the match, Lita countered a Dis-arm-her attempt into a roll-up, but Lynch countered into her own roll-up attempt for a nearfall. Later, Lita performed a headscissors takedown and a Twist of Fate on Lynch for a nearfall. Lynch applied the Dis-arm-her, but released the hold and performed a Manhandle Slam on Lita, who placed her foot on the rope to void the pin. In the climax, Lynch attempted a Moonsault, but Lita moved out of the way and performed a Twist of Fate and a Moonsault on Lynch for a nearfall. Moments later, Lynch performed a second Manhandle Slam on Lita to retain the title.

Before the main event, The Usos (Jey Uso and Jimmy Uso) were scheduled to defend the SmackDown Tag Team Championship against The Viking Raiders (Erik and Ivar), but The Usos attacked The Viking Raiders before the match could begin, thus the match was called off.

Main event
In the main event, Bobby Lashley defended the WWE Championship against AJ Styles, Brock Lesnar, Riddle, Austin Theory, and Seth "Freakin" Rollins in an Elimination Chamber match. Theory and Rollins started the match. Rollins performed a powerbomb on Theory into Lashley's pod. The impact incapacitated Lashley resulting in medical personnel and referees removing Lashley from the chamber. The third entrant was Riddle followed by Styles. The fifth entrant was supposed to be Lashley, however, since Lashley was gone, Lesnar broke through his pod and entered the match. Lesnar performed an F-5 on Rollins to eliminate him. While Lesnar eliminated Riddle with that same move, commentator Michael Cole stated that Lashley was in concussion protocol, meaning that he would not be back in the match (in reality, Lashley had legitimately injured his shoulder prior to the event and the "concussion protocol" was used to write him out of the match), and a new WWE champion was guaranteed. Lesnar performed an F-5 on Styles to eliminate him. After Lesnar dominated Theory, Theory performed a low blow, a rolling dropkick, and a DDT on Lesnar for a nearfall. Theory climbed to the top of a pod, where Lesnar caught up to him. Lesnar slammed Theory into the plexiglass multiple times before performing an F-5 on Theory from the top of the pod. Lesnar then pinned Theory to win the WWE Championship for a seventh time, becoming the first Royal Rumble winner to win a world title before WrestleMania. WWE then confirmed that his WrestleMania match against Universal Champion Roman Reigns would be a Winner Takes All match to unify both the WWE and Universal Championships.

Reception
The men's elimination chamber was the highest rated match of the night, according to Dave Meltzer, which received 3.5 stars. Meanwhile, Roman Reigns vs Goldberg and Charlotte and Sonya vs Ronda and Naomi were the lowest rated matches of the night, both receiving 2 stars. Lita vs Becky Lynch and Drew Mcintyre vs Madcap Moss received 3.25 stars, Rey Mysterio vs The Miz received 2.75 stars, and the women's elimination chamber received 3 stars.

Aftermath

Raw
On the following episode of Raw, new WWE Champion Brock Lesnar set his sights on facing Universal Champion Roman Reigns at WrestleMania 38. Paul Heyman then interrupted, stating that Lesnar would not make it to WrestleMania as the WWE Champion as he had a scheduled rematch against former champion Bobby Lashley on March 5 at the WWE Live show in Madison Square Garden in New York City, although if Lashley was not cleared from his concussion protocol, Heyman would find another worthy challenger. Lashley was not cleared and was replaced by Austin Theory, who Lesnar defeated to retain the title. Following the match, Reigns attacked Lesnar, who fended Reigns and The Usos (Jey Uso and Jimmy Uso) off. Heyman went to strike Lesnar with a chair, but Lesnar caught him. Afterwards, Reigns attacked Lesnar, slamming him onto the steel steps and stood on them. Reigns, with both titles raised overhead, then demanded Lesnar acknowledge him.

Also on the following Raw, The Miz stated that he had found a tag team partner to face Rey and Dominik Mysterio at WrestleMania 38. After Miz teased the identity of his partner, The Mysterios interrupted, stating it did not matter who Miz had chosen. The Miz then revealed it was social media personality Logan Paul, after which, both Miz and Paul attacked The Mysterios.

SmackDown
On the following episode of SmackDown, Universal Champion Roman Reigns and WWE Champion Brock Lesnar had a contract signing for their Winner Takes All match at WrestleMania 38. During the segment, it was announced that the match would also be a Championship Unification match, which WWE began billing as "The Biggest WrestleMania Match of All-Time".

Also on SmackDown, The Viking Raiders (Erik and Ivar) attacked SmackDown Tag Team Champions The Usos (Jey Uso and Jimmy Uso) backstage, stating they wanted their title match since they did not actually get to have their match at Elimination Chamber. They received their championship match the following week where The Usos retained.

A rematch between Drew McIntyre and Madcap Moss was scheduled for the following SmackDown, but it was changed to McIntyre vs. Happy Corbin. This was a trick as Corbin and Moss attacked McIntyre before the match, leading to McIntyre facing Moss, which McIntyre won. On March 3, a match between McIntyre and Corbin was scheduled for WrestleMania 38.

While Naomi joined forces with Sasha Banks in setting their sights at the WWE Women's Tag Team Championship, Ronda Rousey continued her rivalry with Sonya Deville and SmackDown Women's Champion Charlotte Flair. Rousey expressed her intentions to be a role model for her daughter, but was interrupted by Flair. Deville attacked Rousey from behind and Flair joined the beatdown, only for Rousey to gain the upper hand. A match between Rousey and Deville was scheduled for the following week, which Rousey won. After the match, Flair, who was on guest commentary during the match, called Rousey a "one-trick pony." Rousey responded by applying the Ankle lock on Flair to force a submission and send Flair retreating.

Results

Women's Elimination Chamber match

WWE Championship Elimination Chamber match

References

External links 
 

2022 WWE Network events
2022 WWE pay-per-view events
2022 in Saudi Arabia
Entertainment events in Saudi Arabia
WWE in Saudi Arabia
February 2022 events in Saudi Arabia